Loopy is a 2004 film written and directed by Seth Michael Donsky.  It is an adaptation of a short story by Ruth Rendell. Loopy screened at the Palm Springs International Festival of Short Films, the Cinequest Film Festival and the Clermont-Ferrand International Short Film Festival.  Loopy currently airs in rotation on the Independent Film Channel. The tagline for the film is "A sheep in wolf's clothing!"

Cast 
 Michael Countryman –  Colin Highsmith
 Elizabeth Franz –  Mrs. Highsmith
 Henny Russell –  Myra

External links
 

2004 films
2004 horror films
2000s English-language films